2004 J.League Cup Final was the 12th final of the J.League Cup competition. The final was played at National Stadium in Tokyo on November 3, 2004. FC Tokyo won the championship.

Match details

See also
2004 J.League Cup

References

J.League Cup
2004 in Japanese football
FC Tokyo matches
Urawa Red Diamonds matches
J.League Cup Final 2004